The Seoul Open is a defunct Grand Prix and ATP Tour affiliated men's tennis tournament played from 1987 to 1996. It was held at the Seoul Olympic Park Tennis Center in Seoul in South Korea and played on outdoor hard courts.

Past finals

Singles

| [[2022 || Yoshihito Nishioka ||| Denis Shapovalov || 6-4, 7-6

Doubles

External links
ATP Tour Website

 
Tennis tournaments in South Korea
Hard court tennis tournaments
Grand Prix tennis circuit
ATP Tour
Defunct tennis tournaments in Asia
Defunct sports competitions in South Korea